All first-class cricket was cancelled in the 1940 to 1944 English cricket seasons because of the Second World War; no first-class matches were played in England after Friday, 1 September 1939 until Saturday, 19 May 1945.

Ten matches were cancelled at the end of the 1939 English cricket season due to the German invasion of Poland on 1 September and the British government's declaration of war against Germany on Sunday 3 September.

Although eleven first-class matches were arranged during the 1945 season following the final defeat of Germany in early May, it was not until the 1946 season that normal fixtures, including the County Championship and Minor Counties Championship, could resume. In contrast with much of the First World War, it was realised in the 1940s that cricket had its part to play in terms of raising both public morale and funds for charity. Efforts were made to stage matches whenever opportunity arose, especially if a suitable number of top players could be assembled. From the summer of 1941 onwards, teams such as the British Empire Eleven toured the country raising money for war charities.

At league cricket level, playing one-day matches, many competitions continued throughout the war: e.g., the Birmingham League, the Bradford League and the Lancashire League.

Successful wartime players included Laurie Fishlock, Eric Hollies and Eddie Paynter.

1940
In the 1940 Wisden, the cricket author H S Altham described his “sobering experience” when he visited Lord's the previous December.  He said:

...there were sandbags everywhere, and the Long Room was stripped and bare, with its treasures safely stored beneath ground, but ... one felt that somehow it would take more than totalitarian war to put an end to cricket.

Altham reflected the popular (and official) view that the game can and should be kept going whenever possible.

One venue where it would not be possible was The Oval, which was commandeered in 1939 and quickly turned into a prisoner of war camp, except that no prisoners were ever interned there. The playing area became a maze of concrete posts and wire fences.

Lord's was also due for requisition but it was spared and MCC was able to stage many public schools and representative games throughout the war. A highlight in 1940 was the one-day game in which Sir PF Warner’s XI, including Len Hutton and Denis Compton (who top-scored with 73), beat a West Indies XI which included Learie Constantine and Leslie Compton (an honorary West Indian for the day).

Of the more regular wartime teams, the most famous were the British Empire XI and the London Counties XI which were established in 1940. Both played one-day charity matches, mostly in the south-east and often at Lord’s. The British Empire XI was founded by Pelham Warner but featured mainly English county players. The politician Desmond Donnelly, then in the Royal Air Force, began the London Counties XI. In one match between the two, Frank Woolley came out of retirement and played against the new star batsman Denis Compton. The British Empire XI played between 34 and 45 matches per season from 1940 to 1944; the London Counties XI was credited with 191 matches from 1940 to 1945.

Although the teams were successful in raising money for charity, their main purpose was to help sustain morale. Many of the services and civil defence organisations had their own teams, some of them national and featuring first-class players.

County clubs encouraged their players to join the services but at the same time pleaded with their members to continue subscriptions “as an investment for the future”. While some counties (notably Somerset and Hampshire) closed for the duration, others did arrange matches. Nottinghamshire played six matches at Trent Bridge in 1940 and Lancashire mooted a scheme for a regionalised county competition to include the minor counties, but it was not taken further.

1941
From 1941 to 1945 the University Match was played annually at Lord's as a one-day, and hence not first-class, game. Because Fenner's had not been commandeered, Cambridge had played nine matches during the 1941 season against Sussex and strong military and hospital teams and won four against a single defeat, whereas Oxford had played no cricket whatsoever due to The Parks being commandeered. Consequently, Cambridge were expected to and did win the match and were to win easily all but one of the subsequent one-day University Matches. Cambridge's most famous player was John Bridger, who played after the war for Hampshire with considerable success.

In public school cricket, a future champion in Trevor Bailey demonstrated his latterly-famous defensive skill for Dulwich College by scoring 851 runs in fifteen innings – in only seven of which was he dismissed. Dulwich also had the best school bowler in Horace Kiddle, who took fifty wickets for 7.86 runs each but was killed in action in 1944 before World War II ended, whilst future Worcestershire bowler George Chesterton of Malvern took 45 wickets for 12.88 runs each, but could not make the Wisden editors best school eleven. Edward Spooner, a son of famous Marlborough and Lancashire batsman Reggie, averaged 49.50 for Eton and was tipped for a big future, but was never to play first-class cricket at all.

The British Empire XI was dominated by West Indian leg-spinner Bertie Clarke – exempt from military service because of his profession as a doctor – whose leg-breaks and googlies took 98 wickets for 11.40 runs apiece and was to better this record in 1942. In contrast, the main players for the London Counties XI were veterans, with Alf Gover their most successful bowler with 83 wickets for 9.50.

1942
As the war grew more intense, Lord's was still able to expand its profits, with 1942 described as “the best wartime season Lord’s has had”. Jack Robertson came to prominence with an innings of 102 for the Army against the Royal Navy

Eddie Paynter scored 970 runs at an average of 138.50 for Keighley in the Bradford League, whist Bailey took 52 wickets for Dulwich at 6.16 runs apiece to follow up his high-class batting from the previous season. Essex veteran Jack O’Connor scored 208 – the only double-century in wartime cricket – in a two-day match on 4 and 5 July against Peterborough. whilst Clarke surpassed his 1942 record for the Empire XI. In public school cricket, the most significant discovery was Nigel Howard of Rossall School, who scored 456 runs at an average of 45 and took twenty-four cheap wickets, whilst future Derbyshire captain Donald Carr made his debut for Repton as a spin bowler.

1943
A drawn one-day match at Lord's between an England XI and a West Indies XI featured the young Alec Bedser and Trevor Bailey. Bedser made his mark by taking 6/27 in the West Indies first innings. In the drawn Sir PF Warner's XI v Royal Australian Air Force match at Lord's, Keith Miller top-scored in the RAAF's first innings, with 45 out of 100, as well as taking 2/20. The RAAF won a two-day match against The South at Hove by ten wickets. A strong England XI beat The Dominions by 8 runs in a two-day match at Lord's. Les Ames made 133 in the England first innings, and Denis Compton then took 6/15 in eight overs. In their second innings, The Dominions came close to snatching an unlikely victory, with Stewie Dempster making 113.

1944
At Lord's, two one-day matches were played by an England XI against “West Indies” and “Australia”, England winning both matches. (These were not limited overs matches.) Jack Young, unknown before the war but later to win two County Championships for Middlesex, took 88 wickets for London Counties XI at 7.63 runs apiece.

References

External links
 Cricket in England in 1940
 Cricket in England in 1941
 Cricket in England in 1942
 Cricket in England in 1943
 Cricket in England in 1944

1940 in English cricket
1941 in English cricket
1942 in English cricket
1943 in English cricket
1944 in English cricket
English cricket seasons in the 20th century
Events cancelled due to World War II